Disney's Candlelight Processional is an annual event held at Disneyland in California and Epcot at Walt Disney World in Florida. The processional is currently performed for two nights only at Disneyland, and throughout the month of December at Epcot at Walt Disney World. The event was started by Walt Disney himself and has become an annual holiday tradition for many guests.

Event background and history
Each performance is narrated by a guest narrator, typically a celebrity, often who has been previously affiliated with The Walt Disney Company. At Disneyland, the narrator of the event is kept secret until the day of the first performance, while Walt Disney World announces their narrator lineup ahead of time so guests can plan their vacations accordingly to which narrator they would like to see. Dining packages are available to purchase that guarantees a seat inside the American Gardens Theatre at the American pavilion at Epcot. Prior to 1994 the processional was performed at Magic Kingdom, with the first narrator being Rock Hudson.

The term processional refers to the choir entering one by one, typically wearing traditional choir robes, while holding a candle. Originally, singers held real candles with an authentic flame, which have since been replaced by electronic candles. The first guest narrator of the processional was actor Dennis Morgan at Disneyland in 1961. Walt Disney last attended the processional in December 1965 with Dick Van Dyke as narrator.

The event is one of the many seasonal entertainment offerings located at Epcot during the International Festival of the Holidays. At Disneyland, the event is held on Main Street, U.S.A. with a stage setup around the train station in Town Square. At Epcot, the professional a cappella singing group Voices of Liberty are utilized in the show as featured singers and soloists and both versions include a live orchestra.

The songs are custom composed and arranged for Disney to retell the nativity story. The celebrity narrator tells the story in short passages mixed with songs. The show typically has stayed the same year to year, but it continues to be updated. It uses guest choirs, primarily youth choirs, referred to as a mass choir. The show is performed three times each night at Epcot, with youth choirs performing in the first show and Disney cast members in the second two shows. Cast members (employees) are selected to perform in the show based on auditions that are held prior in the year, with rehearsals being held weekly leading up to performance time. Merchandise is sold to honor the event inside the parks, typically including t-shirts and trading pins.

Disneyland Candlelight Processional Narrator History
 2004 - Marie Osmond   
 2005 - Dick Van Dyke   
 2006 - Andy Garcia - Hector Elizondo 
 2007 - Jane Seymour 
 2008 - John Stamos 
 2009 - Jon Voight 
 2010 - Tom Skerritt
 2011 - Gary Sinise 
 2012 - Dennis Haysbert, Kurt Russell, Edward James Olmos, Lou Diamond Phillips, Dick Van Dyke, Patricia Heaton, John Stamos, Molly Ringwald 
 2013 - Kurt Russell - Blair Underwood
 2014 - Beau Bridges  
 2015 - Lana Parrilla - Geena Davis 
 2016 - Ginnifer Goodwin
 2017 - Chris Hemsworth
 2018 - Chris Pratt
 2019 - Lin-Manuel Miranda
 2020 - Event Not Held Due to COVID-19
 2021 - Sterling K. Brown
 2022 - Viola Davis

Magic Kingdom Candlelight Processional Narrator History
1971 - Rock Hudson
1972 - Cary Grant 
1973 - Rock Hudson
1974 - Rock Hudson 
1975 - Dean Jones
1976 - Joseph Campanella
1977 - Rock Hudson
1978 - Ross Martin
1979 - Perry Como
1980 - Rock Hudson
1981 - James Hampton - Darren McGavin 
1982 - Pat & Shirley Boone 
1983 - Joseph Campanella
1984 - Rock Hudson
1985 - Howard Keel
1986 - Howard Keel
1987 - Dean Jones
1988 - Walter Cronkite
1989 - McLean Stevenson
1990 - Joseph Campanella
1991 - George Kennedy
1992 - Paula Zahn
1993 - James Earl Jones

Epcot Candlelight Processional Narrator History 
 2006 - Rita Moreno, Marie Osmond, Steven Curtis Chapman, Kirk Cameron, Gary Sinise, Marlee Matlin, Brian Dennehy, Maureen McGovern, Mario Lopez, Cuba Gooding Jr. ''
 2007 - Andi MacDowell, Kirk Cameron, Monique Coleman, Marlee Matlin, Rita Moreno, Chita Rivera, Neil Patrick Harris, Steven Curtis Chapman, Gary Sinise, John O'Hurley, Edward James Olmos, David Robinson, Dennis Franz 
 2008 - John O'Hurley, Neil Patrick Harris, Brian Stokes Mitchell, Virginia Madsen, Marlee Matlin, Monique Coleman, Abigail Breslin, Chita Rivera, Angela Bassett, Courtney B. Vance, Steven Curtis Chapman, Edward James Olmos 
 2009 - Isabella Rossellini, John O’Hurley, Steven Curtis Chapman, Anika Noni Rose, Andy Garcia, Abigail Breslin, Brian Dennehy, Edward James Olmos, Angela Bassett, Courtney B. Vance, Whoopi Goldberg, Chita Rivera 
 2010 - Isabella Rossellini, John O'Hurley, Corbin Bernsen, Susan Lucci, Jodi Benson, Whoopi Goldberg, Steven Curtis Chapman, Thomas Gibson, Trace Adkins, Brad Garrett, Marlee Matlin, Edward James Olmos 
 2011 - Mira Sorvino, Geena Davis, Isabella Rossellini, Neil Patrick Harris, Chita Rivera, Marlee Matlin, Blair Underwood, Trace Adkins, Edward James Olmos, Susan Lucci, Michael W. Smith
 2012 - Geena Davis, Lea Salonga, Jodi Benson, Neil Patrick Harris, Whoopi Goldberg, Blair Underwood, James Denton, Alfre Woodard, Amy Grant, Gary Sinise, Trace Adkins, Andy Garcia, Marlee Matlin
 2013 - Gary Sinise, Neil Patrick Harris, Ashley Judd, Whoopi Goldberg, Sigourney Weaver, Dennis Haysbert, James Denton, Edward James Olmos, Trace Adkins, Steven Curtis Chapman, Blair Underwood, Amy Grant
2014 - Jodi Benson, Neil Patrick Harris, Jonathan Groff, Whoopi Goldberg, Levar Burton, Edward James Olmos, Joe Morton, Chita Rivera, Ana Gasteyer, Marlee Matlin, Isabella Rossellini, Blair Underwood, Steven Curtis Chapman
2015 - Gary Sinise, Neil Patrick Harris, Whoopi Goldberg, Joe Morton, Ana Gasteyer, Meredith Viera, America Ferrera, Chandra Wilson, Daniel Dae Kim, Edward James Olmos, Blair Underwood, Amy Grant
2016 - Steven Curtis Chapman, Neil Patrick Harris, Whoopi Goldberg, Edward James Olmos, Anthony Mackie, Robby Benson, Meredith Viera, Jim Caviezel, Joe Morton, Ming-Na Wen, Cal Ripken Jr., Jodi Benson
2017 - Laurie Hernandez, Matt Bomer, Ana Gasteyer, Whoopi Goldberg, Pat Sajak, Jodi Benson, Jaci Velasquez, Warwick Davis, Chandra Wilson, Kurt Russell, CCH Pounder, Trace Adkins, Neil Patrick Harris
2018 - Chita Rivera, Helen Hunt, Alfonso Ribeiro, Robby Benson, John Stamos, Neil Patrick Harris, Whoopi Goldberg, Bart Millard, Blair Underwood, Gary Sinise, Pat Sajak, Auli’i Cravalho, Joey Fatone, Cal Ripken Jr., Jodi Benson
2019 - Ming-Na Wen, Neil Patrick Harris, Whoopi Goldberg, Isabella Rossellini, Alton Fitzgerald White, Gary Sinise, Pat Sajak, Geena Davis, Steven Curtis Chapman, Edward James Olmos, Marlee Matlin, Lisa Ling
2020 - Event Not Held Due to COVID-19
2021 - Auli’i Cravalho, Chita Rivera, Jodi Benson, Alton Fitzgerald White, Bart Millard, Lisa Ling, Andy Garcia, Ana Gasteyer, Blair Underwood, Pat Sajak, Courtney B. Vance, Steven Curtis Chapman
2022 - Simu Liu, Chita Rivera, Raul Esparza, Daymond John, Josh Gad, Mariska Hargitay, Angela Bassett, Courtney B. Vance, Neil Patrick Harris, Whoopi Goldberg, Isabella Rossellini, Gloria Estefan, Marie Osmond, Cal Ripken Jr.

Audio recordings
In 1999, the Epcot Candlelight Processional was professionally recorded and released on Walt Disney Records cassette and cd with Phylicia Rashad as guest narrator. The Epcot Candlelight Processional was also recorded and released in 1997, with Louis Gossett Jr. as narrator.

References

External links 
 Information about Epcot's Candlelight Processional

Events at Walt Disney World
Walt Disney Parks and Resorts fireworks
World Showcase